Catherine Gisèle Jeanne Wagener (2 June 19513 May 2011) was a French actress from Paris, known for the Don't Deliver Us from Evil (1971),  Les Glaces (1973), and I Am Frigid... Why? (1972).

Filmography
Les risques du métier (1967)
Désirella (1970)
Don't Deliver Us from Evil (1971)
I Am Frigid... Why? (1972)

Television
Les Glaces (1973)

References

External links
 Catherine Wagener at the BFI
 
 

Year of birth missing
20th-century French actresses
21st-century French actresses
French film actresses
French television actresses
Actresses from Paris